Les Gens qui s'aiment is a 1999 French-language dramedy written and directed by Jean-Charles Tacchella. It stars Richard Berry and Jacqueline Bisset. It was released in France on 5 July 2000.

Plot
Jean-Francois (Berry) is the presenter of a love story-based radio show, he himself has a long-term erratic open relationship with Angie (Bisset). Angie has two daughters, the eldest is the married archetypal housewife, a lifestyle Angie cannot understand. But Winnie, her youngest feels restrained by the strangleholds of a traditional relationship.

Cast
Richard Berry as Jean-Francois
Jacqueline Bisset as Angie
Julie Gayet as Winnie
Bruno Putzulu as Laurent
Marie Collins as Juliette the Housekeeper

References

External links
 
 Trailer

1999 films
1999 comedy-drama films
1990s French-language films
French comedy-drama films
1990s French films